Rosiana Tendean (born 25 August 1964) is an Indonesian retired badminton player.

Career 
A doubles specialist, Tendean competed in women’s doubles with Erma Sulistianingsih at the 1992 Summer Olympics. Together, they won consecutive World Grand Prix Finals titles in 1989 and 1990, and two Indonesia Open titles in 1989 and 1992. Tendean had also won this title earlier with Ivana Lie in 1987, and in mixed doubles with Rudy Gunawan in 1990 and 1993. Rosiana and Rudy Gunawan won three Badminton World Cups in a row between 1990 and 1992, as well as the Hong Kong and Polish Opens in 1993. She won her first significant international title in women's doubles at the 1985 Southeast Asian Games with the veteran Imelda Wiguno. She was a member of the Indonesian Uber Cup winning team in 1994.

Achievements

World Cup 
Women's doubles

Mixed doubles

World Masters Games 

Women's doubles

Mixed doubles

World Senior Championships 

Mixed doubles

Asian Games 
Women's doubles

Mixed doubles

Asian Cup 
Women's doubles

Southeast Asian Games 
Women's doubles

Mixed doubles

IBF World Grand Prix (9 titles, 14 runners-up) 
The World Badminton Grand Prix sanctioned by International Badminton Federation (IBF) from 1983 to 2006.

Women's doubles

Mixed doubles

 IBF Grand Prix tournament
 IBF Grand Prix Finals tournament

IBF International (1 title, 1 runner-up) 
Women's doubles

Mixed doubles

Invitational Tournament 

Women's doubles

References 

1964 births
Living people
Sportspeople from Makassar
Indonesian female badminton players
Badminton players at the 1992 Summer Olympics
Olympic badminton players of Indonesia
Badminton players at the 1986 Asian Games
Badminton players at the 1990 Asian Games
Asian Games silver medalists for Indonesia
Asian Games bronze medalists for Indonesia
Asian Games medalists in badminton
Medalists at the 1986 Asian Games
Medalists at the 1990 Asian Games
Competitors at the 1983 Southeast Asian Games
Competitors at the 1985 Southeast Asian Games
Competitors at the 1987 Southeast Asian Games
Competitors at the 1989 Southeast Asian Games
Competitors at the 1991 Southeast Asian Games
Southeast Asian Games gold medalists for Indonesia
Southeast Asian Games silver medalists for Indonesia
Southeast Asian Games medalists in badminton
20th-century Indonesian women
21st-century Indonesian women